Lamproclytus is a genus of beetles in the family Cerambycidae, containing the following species:

 Lamproclytus elegans Fisher, 1932
 Lamproclytus oakleyi Fisher, 1935

References

Tillomorphini